Long Branch is an unincorporated community in Fayette County, West Virginia, United States. Long Branch had a post office, which closed on October 3, 1998.

The community was named for a nearby and relatively long network of creeks and valleys.

References

Unincorporated communities in Fayette County, West Virginia
Unincorporated communities in West Virginia
Coal towns in West Virginia